Sillénite or sillenite is a mineral with the chemical formula Bi12SiO20. It is named after the Swedish chemist Lars Gunnar Sillén, who mostly studied bismuth-oxygen compounds. It is found in Australia, Europe, China, Japan, Mexico and Mozambique, typically in association with bismutite.

Sillenites refer to a class of bismuth compounds with a structure similar to Bi12SiO20, whose parent structure is γ-Bi2O3, a meta-stable form of bismuth oxide. The cubic crystal sillenite structure is shared by several synthetic materials including bismuth titanate and bismuth germanate. These compounds have been extensively investigated for their non-linear optical properties.

Additional stoichiometries, and modified structures, are also found in  Bi25GaO39, Bi25FeO39, and Bi25InO39. These compounds have gathered recent interest due to their photocatalytic properties.

Recently, sillenites have also gathered interest as heavy metal glass ceramics. They are considered  promising materials for laser technology as
they combine strong nonlinear properties, relative ease of manufacturing, and low production cost.

References

Oxide minerals
Bismuth minerals
Cubic minerals
Minerals in space group 197
Minerals described in 1943